The 204–15 French Basketball Cup season was the 38th season of the domestic cup competition of French basketball. The competition started on September 4, 2014 and ended on May 3, 2015.

Strasbourg IG won its first title, after it beat ESSM Le Portel in the Final. Le Portel had an impressive run in the 2014–15 competition, as a Pro B team it beat several Pro A teams to go on to the championship game. After the 74–87 victory of Strasbourg, Louis Campbell was named the 2015 Most Valuable Player.

Quarterfinals

Semifinals

Final

References

French Basketball Cup
Cup